"Everything" is a song recorded by Greek-Cypriot singer Anna Vissi, written by Nikos Karvelas and Vissi herself. It is best known as the  entry at the Eurovision Song Contest 2006, held in Athens.

At Eurovision

"Everything" was performed sixteenth on the night, following the 's Daz Sampson with "Teenage Life" and preceding 's Lordi with "Hard Rock Hallelujah". Unusually, particularly in comparison to other contest entries, it was performed solo by Vissi, without the presence of backing singers or dancers. Lyrically, the song deals with Vissi's conflicted emotions on ending a relationship. She sings that she is "still in love with everything I hate".

It finished in 9th position with 128 points.

After Eurovision
The song has had a successful commercial release in Greece and in Cyprus, becoming a number 1 hit in both countries and achieving Gold status in Greece. It has also achieved success in Sweden, reaching number 26 at top 60 during the week of 10 August 2006. The video for "Everything" has a "heartbreak" theme in keeping with the tone of the song and features the artist discovering her partner's infidelity and suffering a series of misfortunes before being reconciled with him.

Track listing
"Everything" (Original Version)
"Everything" (Valentino Remix)

Music video and criticism
The video clip's protagonist, played by the singer, discovers that her boyfriend is cheating on her. She leaves the hotel, kicks parked cars and leaves. Her purse is stolen out of her convertible by a thief on a motorbike, and she leaves a gas station without paying to chase after him. She is then pursued by the police and arrested, but escapes and hitchhikes a lorry the driver of which feels her leg.

Resembling a road movie, the clip was criticized for displaying negativity with regards to Greece. Greek politician Georgios Karatzaferis criticized the video clip as "defamatory to Greece" in a speech in the European Parliament. More specifically, Karatzaferis argued that the video harmed the country's reputation in the eyes of future tourists, and that was reason enough for the European Parliament to hold an inquiry into the matter. No such inquiry was planned or ever undertaken.

Cover versions
The song was covered by Conchita Wurst in the final of the Austrian talent show Starmania 2007. Wurst performed it under his real name Tom Neuwirth. Wurst would later have the good fortune of performing the song as a duet with Vissi herself during Vissi's 40th Anniversary concert in July 2014—two months after winning the —in Copenhagen.

Charts

See also
Greece in the Eurovision Song Contest

References

Number-one singles in Greece
Anna Vissi songs
Eurovision songs of Greece
Eurovision songs of 2006
Songs written by Nikos Karvelas
English-language Greek songs
Sony BMG singles
Columbia Records singles
2006 songs